Chionodes suasor is a moth in the family Gelechiidae. It is found in North America, where it has been recorded from Kentucky and Arkansas to Mississippi and Texas.

The wingspan is about 13 mm. Adults have been recorded on wing from April to August.

References

Chionodes
Moths described in 1999
Moths of North America